Fred Hawking (22 September 1909 – 8 September 1988) was an Australian rules footballer who played with Geelong in the VFL during the 1930s.

He was the cousin of Clyde Helmer.

Hawking played his career as both a wingman and centreman. He won Geelong's best and fairest in 1935 and was a premiership player in 1937.

External links

1909 births
Australian rules footballers from Victoria (Australia)
Geelong Football Club players
Geelong Football Club Premiership players
Mooroopna Football Club players
Carji Greeves Medal winners
1988 deaths
One-time VFL/AFL Premiership players